The 2015 2014–2016 CEV Beach Volleyball Continental Cup were a beach volleyball double-gender event. Teams were split into groups of four, where an elimination bracket determined the 3 teams to advance to the next stage from the sub-zones. The winners of the event qualified for the 2016 Summer Olympics.

Men

Round 1

Pool A
Pool A was contested in Matosinhos, Portugal.

Second place match  2–0

Semifinals

4th place

2nd place

Final

 and  qualified to round 3.

Pool B
Pool B was contested in Portoroz, Slovenia.
Round1 Scotland  2–0 

 and  qualified to round 3.

Pool C
Pool C was contested in Umag, Croatia.

Second place match  2–0 

 and  qualified to round 3.

Pool D
Pool D was contested in Bournemouth, England.

Second place match  2–0 

 and  qualified to round 3.

Pool E
Pool E was contested in Marathon, Greece.

Second place match  2–0 

 and  qualified to round 3.

Pool F
Pool F was contested in Vilnius, Lithuania.
Round1  1–2 

 and  qualified to round 3.

Pool G
Pool G was contested in Kardzhali, Bulgaria.

Second place match  2–0 

 and  qualified to round 3.

Pool H
Pool H was contested in Baku, Azerbaijan.

Second place match  1–2 

 and  qualified to round 3.

Round 2

Pool A
Pool A was contested in Odense, Denmark.
Round 1  2–0 

 and  qualified to round 3.

Pool B
Pool B was contested in Edinburgh, Scotland.

Second place match  1–2 

 and  qualified to round 3.

Pool C
Pool C was contested in Mellieha, Malta.
Round 1  2–0 

 and  qualified to round 3.

Pool D
Pool D was contested in Belgrade, Serbia.

Second place match  0–2 

 and  qualified to round 3.

Round 3

Pool A
Pool A was contested in Baden, Austria.

Second place match  2–1 

 qualified to semifinals.
 qualified to round 4.

Pool B
Pool B was contested in Baden, Austria.

Second place match  2–0 

 qualified to semifinals.
 qualified to round 4.

Pool C
Pool C was contested in Lorca, Spain.

Second place match  2–0 

 qualified to the semifinals.
 qualified to round 4.

Pool D
Pool D was contested in Montpellier, France.

Second place match  2–0 

 qualified to the semifinals.
 qualified to round 4.

Pool E
Pool E was contested in Thessaloniki, Greece.

Second place match  1–2 

 qualified to the semifinals.
 qualified to round 4.

Pool F
Pool F was contested in Vilnius, Lithuania.

Second place match  2–1 

 qualified to the semifinals.
 qualified to round 4.

Pool G
Pool G was contested in Paralimni, Cyprus.

Second place match  2–0 

 qualified to the semifinals.
 qualified to round 4.

Pool H
Pool H was contested in Fethiye, Turkey.

Second place match  2–0 

 qualified to the semifinals.
 qualified to round 4.

Round 4

Pool A
Pool A was contested in Vilnius, Lithuania.

Second place match  2–1 

 and  qualified to the final phase.

Pool B
Pool B was contested in Sochi, Russia.

Second place match  2–1 

 and  qualified to the final phase.

Pool C
Pool C was contested in Thessaloniki, Greece.

Second place match  2–1 

 and  qualified to the final phase.

Pool D
Pool D was contested in Tel Aviv, Israel.

Second place match  1–2 

 and  qualified to the final phase.

Final round
The final round was played in Stavanger, Norway 22 to 26 June 2016.

Women

Ranking
The top 8 in CEV Country Ranking as of 31 December 2013 qualified to round 3.

Round 1

Pool A
Pool A was contested in Matosinhos, Portugal.

Second place match  2–0 

 and  qualified to round 3.
 and  continued in round 2.

Pool B
Pool B was contested in Portoroz, Slovenia.
Round1: Northern Ireland  0–2 
Round2: Norway  2–0 
Round2:  2–0 

 5 place:  0–2

Round 1

Round 2

5 place ranked

Semifinals

Final

  and  qualified to round 3.
 ,  and  continued in round 2.

Pool C
Pool C was contested in Umag, Croatia.

Second place match  0–2 

 and  qualified to round 3.
 and  continued in round 2.

Pool D
Pool D was contested in Bournemouth, England.

Semifinals

Second place match England  0–2 

 and  qualified to round 3.
 and  continued in round 2.

Pool E
Pool E was contested in Marathon, Greece.

Semifinals

Final

Second place match  2–0 

 and  qualified to round 3.
 and  continued in round 2.

Pool F
Pool F was contested in Vilnius, Lithuania.
Round1  0–2 

 and  qualified to round 3.
,  and  continued in round 2.

Pool G
Pool G was contested in Kardzhali, Bulgaria.

Second place match  2–0 

 and  qualified to round 3.
 and  continued in round 2.

Pool H
Pool H was contested in Baku, Azerbaijan.

Second place match  2–1 

 and  qualified to round 3.
 and  continued in round 2.

Round 2

Pool A
Pool A was contested in Odense, Denmark.
Round 1  0–2 

 and  qualified to round 3.
,  and  eliminated.

Pool B
Pool B was contested in Edinburgh, Scotland.

Second place match Scotland  2–1 

 and  qualified to round 3.
 and  eliminated.

Pool C
Pool C was contested in Mellieha, Malta.
Round 1  2–0 

 and  qualified to round 3.
,  and  eliminated.

Pool D
Pool D was contested in Belgrade, Serbia.

Second place match  2–0 

 and  qualified to round 3.
 and  eliminated.

Round 3

Pool A
Pool A was contested in Baden, Austria.

Second place match  2–1 

 qualified to the final round.
 and  qualified to round 4.
 eliminated.

Pool B
Pool B was contested in Baden, Austria.

Second place match  2–0 

 qualified to the final round.
 and  qualified to round 4.
 eliminated.

Pool C
Pool C was contested in Lorca, Spain.

Second place match  2–0 

 qualified to the final round.
 and  qualified to round 4.
 eliminated.

Pool D
Pool D was contested in Montpellier, France.

Second place match  2–0 

 qualified to the final round.
 and  qualified to round 4.
 eliminated.

Pool E
Pool E was contested in Thessaloniki, Greece.

Second place match  2–0 

 qualified to the final round.
 and  qualified to round 4.
 eliminated.

Pool F
Pool F was contested in Vilnius, Lithuania.

Second place match  1–2 

 qualified to the final round.
 and  qualified to round 4.
 eliminated.

Pool G
Pool G was contested in Cyprus, Paralimni.

Second place match  2–0 

 qualified to the final round.
 and  qualified to round 4.
 eliminated.

Pool H
Pool H was contested in Fethiye, Turkey.

Second place match  2–1 

 qualified to the final round.
 and  qualified to round 4.
 eliminated.

Round 4

Pool A
Pool A was contested in Vilnius, Lithuania.

Second place match  2–1 

 and  qualified to the final round.
 and  eliminated.

Pool B
Pool B was contested in Sochi, Russia.

Second place match  2–0 

 and  qualified to the final round.
 and  eliminated.

Pool C
Pool B was contested in Greece.

 and  qualified to the final round.
 eliminated.
 did not participate.

Pool D
Pool B was contested in Israel.

 and  qualified to the final round.
 and  eliminated.

Final round
The final round was played in Stavanger, Norway 22 to 26 June 2016.

 qualified to the 2016 Summer Olympics
,  and  qualified to the World Continental Cup

References

External links
Official website

Continental Beach Volleyball Cup
2014 in beach volleyball
2015 in beach volleyball
2016 in beach volleyball